Mercer Frederick Hampson Simpson (27 January 1926 – 11 June 2007), was an English-born writer who spent most of his life in Wales.

He was born in Fulham, London, and educated at King Edward VI School, Bury St Edmunds.  He served in the Royal Marines during World War II, and afterwards studied at Magdalene College, Cambridge.  In 1950, having trained as a teacher, he moved to Cardiff, where he spent most of the rest of his life.  In 1967 he was appointed a lecturer at what later became the University of Glamorgan.  He was active in Welsh literary circles, and was a contributor and editor of several anthologies.

East Anglian Wordscapes  (1993)
Rain from a Clear Blue Sky (1994) 
Early Departures, Late Arrivals (2006);

Sources
Independent obituary

1926 births
2007 deaths
People educated at King Edward VI School, Bury St Edmunds
Academics of the University of Glamorgan
Alumni of Magdalene College, Cambridge
Anglo-Welsh poets
Royal Marines personnel of World War II
20th-century Welsh poets